Southside Story is a New Zealand compilation album released by Dawn Raid Entertainment in 2000.  This album was Dawn Raid's first album release.

History
Southside Story was released in April 2000 at the Otara Leisure Centre at a release party including attendance by Che Fu, King Kapisi, P Money and DJ Sirvere who were there to support what at the time was a first for New Zealand Hip Hop music. It was the first album produced by Dawn Raid and was made on a shoe string budget. The album marked Dawn Raid Entertainment's official entry into the music business and was recorded at Kevy Kev's One Love Studios in Grey Lynn. It introduced unknown artists at the time including 4 Corners, Ill Semantics, K.A.O.S, Native Sons and Brotha D (formerly of the Lost Tribe).

Track listing
Tribute - Live from Waikeria Prison
War - Live Live
Keep Ya Head - K.I.N.D.E.M.S.O.N.S
Life - Godchild & Brotha D
Neva Gon Let U Die - Adeaze
Rize - K.A.O.S
Polynesian Queen - Live Live
Luv Iz Tru - Adeaze
Stylz U Lack - K.A.O.S feat K.D
The Journey - Ill Semantics & Nu Madd Breed
No Foes - 4 Corners
1 Hu Be Tha One - Native Sons

Compilation albums by New Zealand artists
Hip hop albums by New Zealand artists
2000 compilation albums